Aampokhra, or Aam Pokhra, is a village in Uttarakhand, northern India. It is located in Ramnagar tehsil of Nainital district, approximately 81 kilometers from Nainital, the headquarters of the district.

Demographic
With the location code 055442, the village is covered with an area of 300 hectares. The households in the village were 1612 with the total population of 8269 in which 4295 were males and 3974 were females. The persons in the age group of 0 to 6 were 1343 in which 688 were males and 655 were females. In terms of education the village had approximate 5262 literates whereas 3007 were illiterates.

In News 
In the January 2020 there was an incident happened where a 34 year old van Gujjar was attacked by a Tiger. The victim was later referred to the nearest hospital.

Geography
Aampokhra Range is located at 29.3662° N, 78.9854° E coordinate. The village is based at the foothills of the Himalayas. It visited by many tourists due to its beautiful sightseeing. The distance of Jim Corbett National Park from here is 25 km via NH309.

Local Demographic
The local language is Kumaoni, but knowledge of Hindi is widespread. The PIN code of the village is 244715 and the telephone code is 055354.

Nearby villages
The villages near to Aampokhra Range are -
 Lampur Moti
 Lampura Lachhi
 Shahbazpur
 Bichpuri Range
 North Jaspur Range
 South Jaspur Range
 Kanda Range
 Dogadda Range
 Ramnagar Range
 Bijrani Range
 Kosi Range

Transportation Facility
Following are the transport modes available here-
 The nearest railway stations are Haldwani, Kathgodam , Lal Kuan , Ramnagar
 The nearest airports are Jolly Grant Airport, Dehradun and Pantnagar Airport, Pantnagar.

References

Villages in Nainital district